Fabrizio Paolucci (1726–1810) was a marquis (marchese) of the patrician Paolucci family. He is a relative of cardinal Fabrizio Paolucci, and an ancestor of Fabrizio Paolucci, who wrote biographies on the family.

References

Further information

1726 births
1810 deaths
18th-century Italian nobility
19th-century Italian nobility